The Brunswick metropolitan area is the metropolitan area centered on the principal city of Brunswick, Georgia, US. The U.S. Office of Management and Budget, Census Bureau and other entities define Brunswick's metropolitan statistical area as comprising Glynn, Brantley, and McIntosh Counties, including the cities of Brunswick and Darien. In 2012 the area had an estimated population of 113,448.

Counties
Brantley
Glynn
McIntosh

Communities
Places with more than 15,000 inhabitants
Brunswick (Principal city)
Places with 7,500 to 15,000 inhabitants
St. Simons
Country Club Estates
Places with less than 7,500 inhabitants
Dock Junction
Darien
Nahunta
Hoboken

Unincorporated places
Townsend
Eulonia
Hortense
Waynesville
Jekyll Island
Trudie

Demographics
As of the census of 2000, there were 93,044 people, 36,846 households, and 25,557 families residing within the MSA. The racial makeup of the MSA was 73.30% White, 24.13% African American, 0.26% Native American, 0.49% Asian, 0.04% Pacific Islander, 0.73% from other races, and 1.06% from two or more races. Hispanic or Latino of any race were 2.44% of the population.

The median income for a household in the MSA was $33,076, and the median income for a family was $38,960. Males had a median income of $31,138 versus $21,288 for females. The per capita income for the MSA was $16,558.

See also
Georgia statistical areas
List of municipalities in Georgia (U.S. state)
 Golden Isles of Georgia

References
Metropolitan and Micropolitan Statistical Area Definitions – retrieved October 21. 2007

 
Geography of Brantley County, Georgia
Geography of Glynn County, Georgia
Geography of McIntosh County, Georgia
Metropolitan areas of Georgia (U.S. state)
Regions of Georgia (U.S. state)